John A. B. Dillard (September 1, 1919 – May 12, 1970) was a United States Army major general who was killed in action on May 12, 1970, in South Vietnam. General Dillard was one of five U.S. Army general officers killed in action in the  Vietnam War.

Early life and family
General Dillard was married to Betty L. Hawkins and had three children, John A. B. 3rd, Gerry and Revalee.

Education
General Dillard graduated from the Virginia Military Institute, Class of 1942 with a BS degree in civil engineering.

US Army career
Dillard served as a Platoon Leader and Company Commander in Europe during World War II.

During the Korean War from July 1952 until July 1953, he served as a Battalion Operations Officer with the 25th Infantry Division in South Korea.

In November 1969, General Dillard was assigned to South Vietnam as Chief of the Engineer Command.

Death
Also killed was Colonel Carroll Edward Adams Jr. (posthumously promoted to brigadier general), commander of the 937th Engineer Group. Sergeant Major Robert W. Elkey was the only survivor and was seriously injured.

Dillard was buried at Arlington National Cemetery.

See also
U.S. Army general officers killed in action in the Vietnam War:
 William R. Bond
 George W. Casey, Sr.
 Richard J. Tallman
 Keith L. Ware

References

External links
 

1919 births
1970 deaths
Burials at Arlington National Cemetery
United States Army generals
American military personnel killed in the Vietnam War
Virginia Military Institute alumni
United States Army personnel of World War II
United States Army personnel of the Korean War
United States Army personnel of the Vietnam War